John Berry is an American country music singer. His discography consists of ten studio albums and twenty-two singles. Berry reached number one on the Hot Country Songs charts in 1994 with "Your Love Amazes Me", and has six other top ten hits on the same chart.

Studio albums

1980s

1990s

2000s

2010s

2020s

Holiday albums

Compilation albums

Independent albums
The following albums were originally released independently and re-issued by Patriot Records in 1994.

Singles

Christmas singles

As featured artist

Music videos

References

Discographies of American artists
Country music discographies